NA-193 Shikarpur-II is a constituency for the National Assembly of Pakistan.

Members of Parliament

2018-2022: NA-199 Shikarpur-II

Election 2002 

General elections were held on 10 Oct 2002. Ghous Bux Khan Mahar of PML-Q won by 61,432 votes.

Election 2008 

General elections were held on 18 Feb 2008. Ghous Bux Khan Mahar of PML-Q won by 89,921 votes defeating Sardar Wahid Bakhsh Bhayo of PPP who received 39123 votes.

Election 2013 

General elections were held on 11 May 2013. Ghous Bux Khan Mahar of PML-F won by 77,065 votes defeating Sardar Wahid Bakhsh Bhayo of PPP who received 41919 votes and became the  member of National Assembly.

Election 2018 

General elections were held on 25 July 2018.

†PML (F) contested as part of GDA

See also
NA-192 (Shikarpur-I)
NA-194 (Larkana-I)

References

External links 
Election result's official website

NA-203